Helena Jones Robinson High School is a senior high school in Cockburn Town, Grand Turk Island, Turks and Caicos. Operated by the Ministry of Education, Youth, Culture, and Library Services, it is the only senior high school in Cockburn Town.

History
Circa 2016 the school had 350 students. New facilities in the administration building opened in 2015; the ministry spent $2 million U.S. dollars, including $400,000 for furniture and other infrastructure, to develop an administration building,  which included not only the offices of administrative officials but also additional classrooms, a library, and a printing room. In January 2016 a fire damaged that building's highest floor. Computers and student records were lost as a result. As a result the T&C government stated it would rebuild. There were private fundraisers for the school in the wake of the fire, with one netting $1,457.

References

External links
 Helena J. Robinson High School at Facebook
 Index of articles at Magnetic Media

Secondary schools in British Overseas Territories
Schools in the Turks and Caicos Islands
Grand Turk Island
Cockburn Town